Electricity in Paraguay comes almost entirely from hydropower. As Paraguay is landlocked and has no significant natural gas reserves, its citizens often burn firewood which contributes to deforestation. The government imports fuel to use, and state-owned Petróleos Paraguayos (Petropar) has a monopoly on all crude oil and petroleum product sales and imports in Paraguay. It operates Paraguay's sole refinery, the  Villa Elisa facility.

Oil
Paraguay consumed  of petroleum in 2006. It does not currently produce any crude oil. In February 2006, Paraguay's Public Works Ministry announced that oil had been discovered in the western Chaco region by British oil company CDS Energy Services, though CDS stated that the reservoir was too tight to facilitate unassisted oil production.

State-owned Petróleos Paraguayos (Petropar) has a monopoly on all crude oil and petroleum product sales and imports in Paraguay. It operates Paraguay's sole refinery, the  Villa Elisa facility.

Like many oil-importing countries in the Western Hemisphere, Paraguay has tried to foster the development of special deals for importing crude oil and refined products from Venezuela. Paraguay, along with Uruguay, signed a deal in 2005 to receive crude oil imports from Venezuela under preferential financing terms. In December 2005, ANCAP and PdVSA, the Uruguayan and Venezuelan national oil companies, agreed to fund a study for the proposed doubling of the capacity at the La Teja plant. The project, which would cost an estimated $800 million, would also upgrade facilities at the refinery so that it could handle heavier Venezuelan crude varieties.

Natural gas
Paraguay has no proven natural gas reserves, and it neither produces nor consumes natural gas. In recent years, the country has sought to promote the consumption of natural gas as a way to decrease the use of firewood and charcoal, which has contributed to deforestation in the country. However, barriers to natural gas consumption include a lack of domestic natural gas production and the absence of import pipelines.

Paraguay has attracted some interest from international natural gas companies, with UK-based CDS Oil & Gas announcing in early 2004 that it had successfully completed a production test at its Independencia-1 well in the northwestern part of the country. Other companies that have signed exploration concessions with Paraguay's government include H.A & E.R. Exploraciones, Pilcomayo Petróleos S.A., Hidroener Consultora, Guaraní Exploration, Union Oil, Paraguay Gas, Boreal Petróleos, Aurora Petróleos and Amerisur.

Paraguay has pursued several natural gas import options. In 2001, Brazil proposed the Gas Integration Project (Gasin), a natural gas pipeline linking Bolivia, Argentina, Paraguay, and Brazil. There has not been much progress to date on the implementation of this proposal. In 2002, the Bolivian and Paraguayan governments signed a preliminary agreement allowing for the construction of a pipeline from southern Bolivia to Asuncion.

Electricity
Paraguay generated 51.8 terawatt-hours of electricity in 2004, while consuming only 3.1 TWh. Almost all of the country's electricity production comes from a single facility, the bi-national Itaipu dam. Paraguay is one of the world's largest net exporters of electric power.

Paraguay's state-owned utility, Administracion Nacional de Electricidad (ANDE), controls the country's entire electricity market, including generation, distribution and transmission. It operates a single hydroelectric dam, Acaray, and six thermal power plants, with total installed capacity of 220 megawatts (MW). The company is also responsible for Paraguay's share of two bi-national hydroelectric facilities (see below). Over 92 percent of the country has electricity service.

Paraguay operates two hydroelectric dams in cooperation with its neighbors: Itaipu (Brazil) and Yacyreta (Argentina). The Itaipu dam was the largest hydroelectric facility in the world, before the completion of the Three Gorges Dam in China. Itaipu has 20 generators and a total installed capacity of 14,000 MW, evenly shared between Paraguay and Brazil. In 2004, Paraguay consumed 16 percent of its share of Itaipu production, exporting the rest to Brazil. Yacyreta, completed in 1999, has 20 generators and a total installed capacity of 3,100 MW. In 2014 Paraguay consumed almost 5 percent of its share of Yacyreta's production, exporting the rest to Argentina. In September 2006, Ente Binacional Yacyreta, the binational company responsible for operating the facility, announced that it was cancelling the planned Aña Cuá expansion of the facility.

List of power stations

See also
Mineral industry of Paraguay

References